Punta Chivato Airstrip  was a private airstrip in Punta Chivato, Baja California Sur, Mexico.

Defunct airports in Baja California